Lithosia atuntseica is a moth of the subfamily Arctiinae. It was described by Franz Daniel in 1954. It is found in China.

References

 

Lithosiina
Moths described in 1954